Lika-Primorje operation was a military operation carried out by the Yugoslav Partisan 4th Army against Wehrmacht units and the Croatian Armed Forces. It was conducted in the area of Lika and Western Bosnia from 20 March to 15 April 1945. 

In the first phase, the 4th Army took eastern Lika and Bihać, and in the second it took Gospić, Perušić, Lički Osik and Otočac. After 7 April 1945, units of the 4th Army continued the movement towards Rijeka.

References

See also 
 Knin operation
 Sarajevo Operation
 Mostar operation
 Trieste operation

Yugoslavia in World War II